The year 1936 in archaeology involved some significant events.

Events 
 Pedestal of the Colossus of Nero in Rome removed.

Excavations
 Dmanisi historic site, Georgia.
 Julliberrie's Grave by Ronald Jessup.
 Spiro Mounds by University of Oklahoma.
 Fort Hawkins, Georgia, by Gordon Willey.
 Govurqala, Azerbaijan.
 Al Mina, Syria, by Leonard Woolley.
 Excavation and identification of necropolis at Beit She'arim.
 Excavations at Mersin by John Garstang begin (continue to 1939).
 New excavations at Viroconium (Wroxeter) in England begin (continue to 1937).

Finds
 October - The Mästermyr chest is accidentally discovered on the island of Gotland, Sweden.
 November - Gebang Hindu temple at Yogyakarta on Java is discovered.
 Baghdad Battery discovered in Iraq.
 The Emesa helmet is found by looters near Homs in Syria.
 First undisturbed artefacts of Clovis culture found in New Mexico.
 The Statue of Iddi-Ilum is unearthed in Mari, Syria.

Publications
6 July - Publication of Agatha Christie's novel Murder in Mesopotamia.
 First report on excavations of Iron Age settlement of Biskupin.
 V. Gordon Childe - Man Makes Himself.
 W. F. Grimes - The Megalithic Monuments of Wales.

Births
4 April - Barri Jones, Welsh Classical archaeologist (d. 1999)
12 July - John Wilkes, English Classical archaeologist

Deaths
 9 May - Humfry Payne, English Classical archaeologist (b. 1902)
 10 October - Luigi Maria Ugolini, Italian archaeologist (b. 1895)
December 12 - Arthur Callender, English engineer and archaeologist, assistant to Howard Carter during the excavation of Tutankhamun's tomb (b. 1875)

References

Archaeology
Archaeology
Archaeology by year